The 2015 CIS Men's Final 8 Basketball Tournament was held March 12–15, 2015, in Toronto, Ontario. It was hosted by Ryerson University at the Mattamy Athletic Centre at the Gardens, marking the first time Ryerson had hosted, and the first time the tournament had been played in Toronto in its 53-year history. The 2015 tournament saw gold, silver and bronze medals awarded, respectively, to Carleton, Ottawa, and Ryerson. Carleton accepted the W. P. McGee Trophy, awarded to the national champions. This marked the fifth straight national title for Carleton—its 11th in 13 years—and the first team in CIS history to win 11 national championships.

Participating Teams

Championship Bracket

Consolation Bracket

See also 
2015 CIS Women's Basketball Championship

References 

2016
2014–15 in Canadian basketball